Shonibar Bikel is a 2019 Bangladeshi-German-Russian co-production film directed by Mostofa Sarwar Farooki, a one shot political thriller, inspired from the July 2016 Dhaka attack. The film had its world premiere at the 2019 Moscow International Film Festival. The film has been cleared for release in Bangladesh by Bangladesh Film Censor Board after 4 years.

Plot
On a nice Saturday afternoon during Ramadan, citizens enjoy sleepy day time. Suddenly, a group of terrorists takes over a cafe in the city holding hostages of employees and customers. The police soon surround the building and demand negotiation and surrenders, the terrorists fortify the cafe with gas cylinders continuing their unfair tribunal. Foreigners, the disabled, women, businessmen, artists, non-Muslims, and even Muslims with different sect are subject to brutal hostility. The media streaming live news to attract more viewers doesn't care for the safety of the hostages. Each time a hostage is executed one by one, the nightmare of violence is amplified.

Cast
 Zahid Hasan
 Nusrat Imrose Tisha
 Mamunur Rashid
 Iresh Zaker
 Intekhab Dinar
 Nader Chowdhury
 Gousul Alam Shaon 
 Parambrata Chatterjee 
 Eyad Hourani
 Selina Black
 Ellie Poussot
 Manoj Kumar Pramanik

Release

Screening
The film was premiered in 41st Moscow International Film Festival in April 2019. Then it was screened for Sydney Film Festival in June 2019 in Australia. On July, 2019, it was screened for Filmfest München and London Indian Film Festival. It became a nominee for CineCo Pro Award. It was screened as official Selection in Busan International Film Festival in October 2019. It was also screened in 2019 Hong Kong Asian Film Festival.

Controversy and censorship
In January 2019, the Film Censor Board of Bangladesh banned the theatrical release of Saturday Afternoon which portrays the July 2016 terrorist attack at the Holey Artisan Bakery as it would "damage the country's reputation". The censor board said that the film could "incite religious fervour in the Muslim-majority nation of 165 million". In January, 2021, a group of artists lead by Farooki protested by many ways against the decision. In August, 2022, netizens of Bangladesh protested online against the ban. On 26 August 2022, a group of filmmakers and artists demanded clear explanation for ban the film. On 28 August 2022, a television drama directors' organisation named Director's Guild protested against government and demanded censor clearance of the film. On 29 August 2022, Hasan Mahmud, the information minister of the country, expressed the decision to give permission to release the film under the condition that the director should add extra scenes advised by appeal board. He also claimed that the film didn't show the whole fact. In October 2022, Farooki said that some dialogues may be added to the film's ending to get clearance from the Censor Board. On 21 January 2023, it got green signal of the appeal board to release theatrically in the Bangladesh market.

Reception

Critical response 
Deborah Young of The Hollywood Reporter said about the film, "As in most films that attempt to do everything in a one-shot single take, viewers soon forget technique in the heat of the evolving story. It doesn’t seem to faze either the professional cast or cinematographer Aziz Zhambakiyev (Harmony Lessons), as Valerii
Petrov’s Steadicam goes flying around the airy restaurant with its picture windows onto a police stakeout and walls that seem to change color from blue to red to heighten the drama". Calling it a modernised version of The Petrified Forest, Wally Adams of Easternkicks.com praised performance of its actors.

Accolades

References

External links

 

2019 films
2019 drama films
2010s Bengali-language films
2010s English-language films
Bengali-language Bangladeshi films
English-language Bangladeshi films
Bangladeshi political thriller films
Films directed by Mostofa Sarwar Farooki
Films produced by Mostofa Sarwar Farooki
Jaaz Multimedia films
Censored films
Religious controversies in film
Film controversies in Bangladesh
Bangladeshi films based on actual events